The Second Voyage of the Mimi is a twelve-episode American educational television program depicting a fictional crew of a sailboat named the Mimi exploring Mayan ruins in Southern Mexico. Along the way, they learn about ancient civilization and also attempt to foil the plans of looters who steal the artifacts from the ancient sites. This series is a sequel to The Voyage of the Mimi, produced in 1984, in which the Granvilles rented their boat and services to zoologists studying the humpback whale in the waters off Massachusetts.

The series aired on PBS and was created by the Bank Street College of Education in 1988 to teach middle-schoolers about science and social studies. 

In each episode, viewers are taught something scientific relating to plot events in the previous episode of the show. For example, an episode's plot would be about deciphering Mayan writing, and the viewer also receives information about how the Maya wrote various words and numbers.

Cast

The Second Voyage of the Mimi saw a young Ben Affleck return as C.T. Granville, and Peter G. Marston as his grandfather Captain Granville. Marston was a scientist at Massachusetts Institute of Technology during the production of the program and used to own the actual ship, the Mimi.

Main Cast Listing:
Ben Affleck as Clement Tyler (C.T.) Granville
Peter G. Marston as Captain Clement Tyler Granville
Martha Hill as Pepper Thornton, who is an expert scuba diver
Roger Cudney as Pepper's former employer, Harvey Westerman.
Hector Tellez as Pedro, an employee of Westerman's.
Inaki Carrion as Victor Cobos, an archeologist
Cheryl Lynn Bruce as Terry Gibbs, another archeologist who works with Victor.
Carla Douglin as Quiché Gibbs, Terry Gibbs's daughter.
Enrique Lucero as Tomás Segovia, the man in charge of archeological sites in that part of Mexico.
Patricia Ancira as Rosa Segovia, Tomas Segovia's daughter, also a skilled diver.

Episodes
Each episode consists of two fifteen-minute segments. 

The first segment of each episode follows the serialized tale of scientists studying the ancient Maya and getting involved with thwarting site looters. The two scientists are Victor Cobos, a Mexican man of Maya descent, and Terry Gibbs, an American woman. Terry's husband is revealed to have been killed by site looters. Terry's daughter Quiché has grown up with archeology and can already read Maya writing. They hire the Granvilles in Quintana Roo, Mexico, near Tulum, to help them study the routes of ancient Maya ships. The Granvilles in turn hire Pepper Thornton, the daughter of one of Captain Granville's old sailing buddies, because she is an expert diver. Previously, Pepper worked for Harvey Westerman, a skinflint tour operator, guiding tourists on dives through then reefs. 

Each second segment is a standalone exploration of one of the scientific principles touched on in the serialized tale. In these second segments, one of the child actors (Ben Affleck or Carla Douglin) comes out of character and interviews real, in many cases well-known, scientists abouts their work. These scientists include archeologists Bill Fash, Peter Reynolds and David Stuart, and rain forest ecologist Nalini Nadkarni. In addition, Martha Hill, a silver medalist in the Winter Paralympics, comes out of character in an interview with Ben Affleck at the beginning of the information segment titled "Expedition 1 If I can Do This".

The real vessel Mimi
The Mimi was a French-built sailboat, originally constructed in 1931 as a small cargo and fishing vessel. It was purchased in the early 1980s by Peter Marston and was kept moored in Gloucester, Massachusetts. Besides its appearances on the TV show, it went from city to city and acted as a tourist attraction in places such as Salem, Massachusetts, Boston, and other cities. 
In 1988, Peter Marston and some freelance musicians produced a cassette and songbook called "Sea Songs from the Mimi Crew" of old-time sea songs self-published under the name "The Barn School" based in Gloucester, Massachusetts.  The cassette and songbook were available from the actual sailing vessel Mimi, as well as where music was sold, and in museum gift shops. The cassette and songbook are now out of print.
Also available from the sailing vessel Mimi were souvenirs such as T-shirts and buttons that said "I was on board the Mimi." The souvenirs are no longer manufactured, and have hardly turned up on Internet marketers such as eBay or Amazon.
Marston retained ownership of the vessel until 1998, when the boat was sold to new owners; Captain George G. Story of Gloucester, Massachusetts, his brother Captain Alan M. Story of Deltona, Florida and Spiro "Steve" Cocotas, also from Gloucester. They operated the vessel as Three Mates Inc. for several years, bringing the boat to as many as 28 cities along the east coast. The Mimi eventually fell into disrepair, and was scrapped in 2011.

References

External links

PBS original programming
Science education television series
1980s American television miniseries
1988 American television series debuts
1988 American television series endings
English-language television shows
Archaeology of Mexico